Tolga Özgen (born 28 February 1980) is a Turkish professional footballer goalkeeper.

Özgen began his career with local club with Gençlerbirliği. In 2000, he was transferred to İnegölspor. İstanbul Büyükşehir Belediyespor transferred him in 2003. He was loaned out to Giresunspor and Kasımpaşa during the 2005–06 season. Kasımpaşa transferred him in 2006.

References

1980 births
Living people
Footballers from Ankara
Turkish footballers
Turkey B international footballers
Gençlerbirliği S.K. footballers
İnegölspor footballers
İstanbul Başakşehir F.K. players
Giresunspor footballers
Kasımpaşa S.K. footballers
Elazığspor footballers
Gaziantep F.K. footballers
Süper Lig players
TFF First League players
Association football goalkeepers